Quy Nhơn station is a railway station on the North–South railway in Vietnam. It serves the city of Qui Nhơn, in Bình Định Province.

The city is not very important so the unification express does not stop, it does stop at Diêu Trì railway station nearby. But from Hồ Chí Minh City the SE 35 stops at Qui Nhơn.

Buildings and structures in Bình Định province
Railway stations in Vietnam